Cynthia "Cindy" Hill (born February 12, 1948) is an American professional golfer who played on the LPGA Tour.

Hill won the U.S. Women's Amateur in 1974 after having lost the final twice before (1970 and 1972). She won the 1975 North and South Women's Amateur. She represented the U.S. in the Curtis Cup four times (1970, 1974, 1976, 1978) and the Espirito Santo Trophy three times (1970, 1974, 1978). She played college golf at the University of Miami and was an All-American in 1969 and 1970. Her team won the AIAW Championship in 1970. She turned pro at age 31.

Hill won twice on the LPGA Tour, in 1984 and 1987.

Professional wins

LPGA Tour wins (2)

LPGA Tour playoff record (0–2)

U.S. national team appearances
Amateur
Curtis Cup: 1970 (winners), 1974 (winners), 1976 (winners), 1978 (winners)
Espirito Santo Trophy: 1970 (winners), 1974 (winners), 1978

References

External links

American female golfers
Miami Hurricanes women's golfers
LPGA Tour golfers
Winners of ladies' major amateur golf championships
Golfers from Michigan
People from South Haven, Michigan
1948 births
Living people